The FV101 Scorpion is a British armoured reconnaissance vehicle, and also a light tank. It was the lead vehicle and the fire support type in the Combat Vehicle Reconnaissance (Tracked), CVR(T), family of seven armoured vehicles. Manufactured by Alvis, it was introduced into service with the British Army in 1973 and was withdrawn in 1994. More than 3,000 were produced and used as a reconnaissance vehicle or a light tank. 

It holds the Guinness world record for the fastest production tank; recorded doing  at the QinetiQ vehicle test track, Chertsey, Surrey, on 26 January 2002.

History
The Alvis Scorpion was developed to meet a British Army requirement for the Combat Vehicle Reconnaissance (Tracked) or CVR(T). In 1967, Alvis was awarded the contract to produce 30 CVR(T) prototypes. Vehicles P1–P17, the Scorpion prototypes, were delivered on time and within the budget. After extensive hot and cold weather trials in Norway, Australia, Abu Dhabi and Canada, the Scorpion was accepted by the British Army in May 1970, with a contract for 275, which later rose to 313 vehicles. The first production vehicles were completed in 1972 and the first British regiment to be equipped with the Scorpion was the Blues and Royals of the Household Cavalry in 1973. 
 
Alvis built more than 3,000 Scorpion vehicles for the British Army, Royal Air Force Regiment and the export market. All of the CVR(T) vehicles were to be air-portable; and two Scorpions could be carried in a Lockheed C-130 Hercules. Another requirement of the CVR(T) project was the low ground pressure, similar to that of a soldier on foot; this would serve it well in the boggy conditions of the Falklands War.

Armament

The Scorpion was armed with the low velocity 76 mm L23A1 gun, which could fire high-explosive, HESH, smoke and canister rounds. Storage was provided for 40 or 42 rounds. A 7.62 mm coaxial L7 GPMG (3,000 rounds carried) was also fitted, as were two multi-barrelled smoke grenade dischargers, one on each side of the turret. The main armament has an elevation of 35 degrees and a depression of 10 degrees; the turret has a full 360-degree traverse. The traverse was however hand-cranked, a cost-saving feature that made the turret relatively slow and laborious to traverse relative to other vehicles of its type. This gun was later deemed to be unsatisfactory, as RAF testing showed that the lack of a fume extraction system caused toxic fumes to enter the fighting compartment, endangering the crew's health.

Engine
The original engine was the Jaguar J60 Mk 100b 4.2-litre petrol engine, which was replaced by a Cummins or Perkins diesel engine. The Irish engineering company IED replaced the Jaguar engine in Irish Army Scorpions with a Steyr M16 TCA HD engine (6-cylinder, 145 kW), making the Scorpion more powerful and more reliable in critical environments.

Armour
The FV101 was a very light armoured vehicle, weighing in at a mere 8 tonnes. This meant some compromises had to be made on protection. The vehicle had 12.7 mm of sloped aluminium armour, giving an average effective thickness of 25 mm. 

The initial manufacture of the aluminium armour resulted, after time and effects of the environment, in failure; "Stress Corrosion Cracking" (SCC) which seriously affected all early builds.

Other systems
The vehicle was fitted with a nuclear, biological, chemical protection system, image intensification sights for gunner and driver and a floatation screen. A commode was located under the commander's seat. An internal water tank and a boiling vessel for cooking and heating water were also provided.

Service history
The Scorpion was or is used by the armed forces of Belgium, Botswana, Brunei, Chile, Honduras, Iran, Indonesia, Ireland, Jordan, Malaysia, New Zealand, Nigeria, Oman, Philippines, Spain, Tanzania, Thailand, Togo, Venezuela and the United Arab Emirates. Iranian army acquired 250 Scorpions in the late 1970s and a number of them are still in use after being refurbished locally as the Tosan tank. The Scorpion was on occasion deployed to main UK airports as a measure against possible terrorist threats, e.g., Operation Marmion at Heathrow Airport in 1974. Similar operations in 2003 used the then-current Scimitar.

Combat use

B Squadron, Blues and Royals were airlifted and deployed into the Akrotiri and Dhekelia Sovereign Base areas, during the Turkish invasion of Cyprus 1974.

Two troops from B Squadron, Blues and Royals served in the Falklands War. One troop was equipped with four Scorpions, the other with four FV107 Scimitars. These were the only armoured vehicles used in action by the British Army during the conflict. Scorpions also served in the Gulf War. The 16th/5th The Queen’s Royal Lancers deployed in the first gulf war (Op Granby) using all variants of the CVR(T) range carrying out the role of Force Reconnaissance for the British spearhead towards Iraq operating forward of other official green army units. The 1st The Queen's Dragoon Guards, a reconnaissance regiment, had 32 and the close reconnaissance troops of the armoured regiments each had eight. They were also used by No. 1 Squadron RAF Regiment, which was attached to the British 1st Armoured Division.

Foreign users
Some small armies, such as the Botswana Defence Force, and some larger armies such as the Iranian Army and Nigerian Army, continue to use the Scorpion, in some cases up-armed with the 90 mm Cockerill.

The Iranian army used its Scorpion tanks in the Iran–Iraq War, with various degrees of success. Early in the war, Iranians used the Scorpions's "accurate fire" (alongside the Cobra attack helicopters) to hold back Iraqi 2nd Infantry Division's offensive towards the city of Ilam.
However, the Scorpions proved less effective when faced with Iraq's 9th Armoured Division:
A second [Iraqi] column rushed to Susangerd, which it crossed without encountering any resistance, the city having apparently been left defenseless. The column continued in the direction of Hamidiyeh. It came into contact with the [Iranian] 92nd Armored Division's reconnaissance regiment, which met it with effective in-depth defense. Yet the Iranians eventually had to yield in the face of Iraqi pressure. Their Scorpions' 90 mm guns did not hold their weight against the T-62 tanks' 115 mm guns. The Iraqis thus took control of Hamidiyeh, then Bozorg.

The British government provided Iran (and Iraq) with limited parts for their Scorpions during the war:
Regarding military matters, the British government imposed two strict rules: contracts signed before the war would be honored, but the sale of equipment likely to significantly increase either side's military capacities was banned. Interpreting these regulations loosely, the British government delivered both the Iranians and the Iraqis motors and spare parts for Chieftain and Scorpion tanks, which would allow the former to maintain tanks acquired under the Shah and the latter to repair tanks captured from the Iranian army.

Variants

 Scorpion 90 — The Scorpion 90 or Scorpion 2 was a version armed with the long-barrelled Cockerill Mk3 M-A1 90mm gun designed for the export market.

 AVGP Cougar — The Scorpion turret was mated with the MOWAG Piranha I chassis to create the AVGP Cougar fire support vehicle, which was used by the Canadian Armed Forces.

 Sabre — The Scorpion has been withdrawn from British Army service and the refurbished hulls have been mated with surplus turrets from the FV 721 Fox CVR(W) wheeled reconnaissance vehicle to form a composite vehicle—the Sabre reconnaissance vehicle.

 Salamander — A small number of converted Scorpions are in use at British Army Training Unit Suffield in Canada as part of OPFOR. With the main armament barrel replaced with a dummy they represent 125mm gun armed T-80-type vehicles.

 M113A1 Medium Reconnaissance Vehicle — The Australian Army operated Medium Reconnaissance Vehicle (MRV), formerly M113A FSV, which comprised a Scorpion turret fitted to the hull of a M113A1. This variant entered service in 1976 and was retired in 1996.

Operators

Current operators
 
25 units.
 
16 units.
 
27 units; currently 15 in service in the Chilean Marine Corps.
 
19 units.
 
280 units.
 

90 units.
 
26 units.
 
150 units.
 
120 Units.
 

Philippine Army: Original delivery of 41 units; Current active 7 units, to be replaced by the Sabrah Light Tank.
 
100 units.
 
40 units.
 
12 units. Including one FV-106 Samson, one FV-104 Samaritan and one Fv-105 Sultan.
 
76 Units.
 
78 Scorpion 90, 4 or 6 FV-104 Samaritan, 2 FV-105 Sultan and 4 FV-106 Samson.

Former operators
 
701 units (this total consists of all seven variants of the CVR(T)).

Limited number captured from Iran during Iran–Iraq War
 
14 units.
 
 : 26 units
 
26 units.
 
17 units in service until 2009 with the Spanish Navy, (Infantería de Marina Española). Sold to Chile. There are a couple of units on static display as of 2011
 
1,500 units ordered. Withdrawn from active service in 1994.

See also

 Combat Vehicle Reconnaissance (Tracked)
 FV102 Striker anti-tank guided weapon carrier
 FV103 Spartan armoured personnel carrier
 FV104 Samaritan armoured ambulance
 FV105 Sultan command post vehicle
 FV106 Samson armoured recovery vehicle
 Alvis Stormer – a larger development of the CVR(T) used in the case of the British Army to carry the Starstreak High Velocity Missile system and Shielder minelaying system
 Tosan, Iranian-built development of Scorpions supplied to Iran in the 1970s, carrying a 90mm gun and Toophan ATGM

References

Sources

 
 

Light tanks of the United Kingdom
Cold War tanks of the United Kingdom
Light tanks of the Cold War
Reconnaissance vehicles of the United Kingdom
Fire support vehicles
Alvis vehicles
Military vehicles introduced in the 1970s
Reconnaissance vehicles of the Cold War
Tracked reconnaissance vehicles